Ictidosuchoides is an extinct genus of ictidosuchid therocephalians. Fossils have been found from the Karoo Basin in South Africa. The genus is known to have been one of the few therocephalians to have survived the Permian-Triassic extinction event in this area, although its numbers were quite low after the extinction.

See also 

 List of therapsids
 Ictidosuchops

References

External links 
 The main groups of non-mammalian synapsids at Mikko's Phylogeny Archive

Ictidosuchids
Therocephalia genera
Lopingian genus first appearances
Changhsingian genera
Induan genera
Early Triassic genus extinctions
Lopingian synapsids of Africa
Early Triassic synapsids of Africa
Permian South Africa
Triassic South Africa
Fossils of South Africa
Fossil taxa described in 1931
Taxa named by Robert Broom